East Prairie Metis Settlement is a Metis settlement in northern Alberta, Canada within Big Lakes County. It was founded in 1939.

Demographics 

The population of the East Prairie Metis Settlement according to its 2018 municipal census is 491, an increase from its 2015 municipal census population count of 459.

See also 
List of communities in Alberta
List of designated places in Alberta

References 

1939 establishments in Alberta
Big Lakes County
Métis settlements in Alberta
Designated places in Alberta